Austin Edward Ford (August 31, 1857 – September 17, 1896) was an American publisher and Fire Commissioner of New York.

Biography
Austin Edward Ford was born on August 31, 1857 in Boston, Massachusetts to Ellen and Thomas Irwin Ford. He was editor of the New York Freeman, and was associated with the Irish World, a newspaper run by his uncle, Patrick Ford. As such, he was active in promoting the cause of Irish independence.

Ford moved to Manhattan, where he later ran for New York's 7th congressional district for the United States Congress, losing to the Democratic Party candidate, Franklin Bartlett, in 1894. At the time he lived at 2767 Marion Avenue in what is now the Borough of the Bronx. He was appointed  Fire Commissioner in 1895 by fellow Republican, Mayor Strong.

Death
He died in office aged 39 on September 17, 1896 from appendicitis.

Legacy
Ford was a direct ancestral relative of Bishop Francis Xavier Ford, M.M., a missionary killed during the Korean War, as well as Sister Ita Ford, M.M., a missionary murdered in El Salvador in 1980, and businessman William P. Ford, brother of Sister Ita, a lawyer and businessman turned human rights activist.

References

External links
Notre Dame Archives

1857 births
1896 deaths
Businesspeople from Boston
American publishers (people)
American editors
American Roman Catholics
American people of Irish descent
Deaths from appendicitis
Commissioners of the New York City Fire Department
New York (state) Republicans
19th-century American businesspeople